The North Channel (known in Irish and Scottish Gaelic as , in Scots as the ) is the strait between north-eastern Northern Ireland and south-western Scotland. It begins north of the Isle of Man, where the Irish Sea ends, and runs north-west into the Atlantic Ocean.

Geography

The North Channel connects the Irish Sea with the Atlantic Ocean and is part of the marine area officially classified as the "Inner Seas off the West Coast of Scotland" by the International Hydrographic Organization (IHO).

The Straits of Moyle ( in Irish and Scottish Gaelic) or Sea of Moyle is the name given to the narrowest expanse of sea in the North Channel between north-eastern Northern Ireland (County Antrim) and south-western highlands of Scotland (Mull of Kintyre). The straits gave their name to Moyle District Council, a local government area in Northern Ireland, and are famed in Irish Celtic mythology through their association with the Children of Lir.

In the 1800s, this strait was sometimes referred to in general terms as the "Irish Channel". In the 19th century, Alexander Keith Johnston's suggested name St Patrick's Channel had currency, but it was rejected by the hydrographic department.

The deepest part is called Beaufort's Dyke.

The North Channel was a favourite haunt of privateers preying on British merchant shipping in wars until the 19th century; in 1778, during the American Revolutionary War, it was also the site of a naval duel between American captain John Paul Jones's USS Ranger and the Royal Navy's HMS Drake. It is crossed by many ferry services. In 1953, the channel was the scene of a serious maritime disaster, the sinking of the ferry Princess Victoria.

Swimming

The Irish Long Distance Swimming Association (ILDSA) has provided authentication observers for swimmers attempting to cross the approximately  span between Northern Ireland and the Mull of Galloway.  According to the ILDSA, this was first accomplished in 1947 by Tom Blower. The first two-way crossing was completed by a six-person relay team on 28 July 2015.

In 2020, Emma-Claire Fierce became the first French woman to attempt the swim.

The World Open Water Swimming Association note that the North Channel, which it also refers to parenthetically as the North (Irish) Channel, is part of the Ocean's Seven series. This is a set of seven long-distance open-water swims considered the marathon swimming equivalent of the Seven Summits mountaineering challenge.

Fixed connections
In Northern Ireland, Unionist political leaders for decades lobbied the British government to construct a railway tunnel under the Channel, for a better link between Northern Ireland and the rest of the United Kingdom. In the Victorian era, engineers proposed a rail tunnel between Stranraer and Belfast.

In February 2020, the Prime Minister's Office announced that it had initiated work to examine the feasibility of bridge between Scotland and Northern Ireland.

First Minister of Scotland Nicola Sturgeon said her mind was not closed to the idea but added "if he [the prime minister] has got £20 bn to build such a bridge going spare at the moment – that could be spent on more important priorities".

See also
St George's Channel

References

External links
 BBC – Northern Ireland – A Short History (accessed 4 March 2007)

Bodies of water of the Irish Sea
Straits of the British Isles
Straits of Scotland
Northern Ireland coast
Scottish coast
Landforms of Argyll and Bute
Landforms of County Antrim
Landforms of County Down
Landforms of Dumfries and Galloway
Bodies of water of Northern Ireland
Borders of Scotland